Stephy Zaviour is an Indian costume designer from Kerala, known for her extensive work in Malayalam cinema. She started her career as costumer designer in the industry when she was just 23. She completed over 65 films by the year 2021, including Lord Livingstone 7000 Kandi, Guppy and Ezra. In 2016, Stephy won her first Kerala State Award for Costume Designer for her work in the movie Guppy.

Stephy Zaviour was born to Late Zaviour Karivelil and Gracy Karivelil and brought up in Wayanad, Kerala. She had her schooling at St.Joseph Higher Secondary School, Kallody, and graduated with a bachelor's degree from K.L.E. Society's S. Nijalingappa College, Bangalore.

References

Living people
1992 births
Costume designers of Malayalam cinema
Kerala State Film Award winners
Indian costume designers
21st-century Indian designers
21st-century Indian women artists
Women costume designers